Stephen James Napier Tennant (21 April 1906 – 28 February 1987) was a British socialite known for his decadent, eccentric lifestyle. He was called "the brightest" of the "Bright Young People".

Early life

Tennant was born into British nobility, the youngest son of a Scottish peer, Edward Tennant, 1st Baron Glenconner, and the former Pamela Wyndham, one of the Wyndham sisters and of The Souls clique. His mother was also a cousin of Lord Alfred Douglas (1870–1945), Oscar Wilde's lover and a sonneteer. On his father's death, Tennant's mother married Lord Grey, a fellow bird-lover. Tennant's eldest brother Edward – "Bim" – was killed in the First World War. His elder brother David Tennant founded the Gargoyle Club in Soho.

Social set
During the 1920s and 1930s, Tennant was an important member – the "Brightest", it is said – of the "Bright Young People". His friends included Rex Whistler, Cecil Beaton, the Sitwells, Lady Diana Manners and the Mitford girls. He is widely considered to be the model for Cedric Hampton in Nancy Mitford's novel Love in a Cold Climate, one of the inspirations for Lord Sebastian Flyte in Evelyn Waugh's Brideshead Revisited, and a model for the Hon. Miles Malpractice in some of Waugh's other novels.

Writing
For most of his life, Tennant tried to start or finish a novel – Lascar: A Story You Must Forget. It is popularly believed that he spent the last 17 years of his life in bed at the house he inherited from his parents, Wilsford House at Wilsford cum Lake, Wiltshire, which he had redecorated by Syrie Maugham. Though undoubtedly idle, he was not truly lethargic: he made several visits to the United States and Italy, and struck up many new friendships. His later reputation as a recluse became increasingly true only towards the last years of his life. Yet even then, his life was not uneventful: he became landlord to V. S. Naipaul, who immortalised Tennant in his novel The Enigma of Arrival.

Personal life
During the 1920s and 1930s Tennant had a sexual affair with the poet Siegfried Sassoon. Prior to this he had proposed to a friend, Elizabeth Lowndes, but had been rejected. (Philip Hoare relates how Tennant discussed plans with Lowndes about bringing his nanny with them on their honeymoon.) His relationship with Sassoon, however, was to be his most important: it lasted some six years before Tennant off-handedly put an abrupt end to it. Sassoon was reportedly devastated, but recovered to marry in 1933 and become a father in 1936.

When Tennant died in 1987, he had far outlived most of his contemporaries. A large archive of his letters, scrapbooks, personal ephemera and artworks is held in The Viktor Wynd Museum of Curiosities, Fine Art & Natural History in Hackney, London.

In popular culture 
The character of Cedric Hampton in the novel Love in a Cold Climate is based on Tennant.

The character of Miles Malpractice in the novel Vile Bodies is based on Tennant.

Lord Sebastian Flyte, a character in the novel Brideshead Revisited, is partly based on Tennant.

The narrator of Shola von Reinhold's novel LOTE (2020) is obsessed ("transfixed") with Tennant, and mentions him throughout the book.

He was played by Calam Lynch in the 2021 Terence Davies film Benediction.

References

Further reading
 Philip Hoare: Serious Pleasures: The Life of Stephen Tennant (1992)

External links 

 Stephen Tennant Papers. James Marshall and Marie-Louise Osborn Collection, Beinecke Rare Book and Manuscript Library, Yale University.

1906 births
1987 deaths
English people of Scottish descent
English socialites
Younger sons of barons
English LGBT people
Stephen
20th-century LGBT people